Mazdoor Zindabaad is a 1976 Bollywood film directed by Naresh Kumar.

Cast
Randhir Kapoor
Suhail as Master Suhail
Parijat as Baby Parijat
Ajay as Master Ajay
Ashok Kapoor as Ashok 
Parveen Babi as Kamla 
Indira Bansal as Mrs. Hansraj 
Manmohan Krishna as Chunilal 
Moolchand as Sethji

Soundtrack
"Meri Munni Rani Soja, Tujhko Sulane Raat Aayi" - K. J. Yesudas
"Mazdoor Zindabad, Kaam Ki Puja Karne Wale" - Mohammed Rafi
"Bhookh Hi Bhookh Hai, Insaan Se HewaanKa Dil" - Mohammed Rafi
"Humko Paisa Na Do, Hum Bikhari Nahi" - Anupama Deshpande, Asha Bhosle
"Do Bhai Akele Rah Gaye" - Shailendra Singh
"Yeh Aaj Ka Bharat Hai" - Asha Bhosle, Jaspal Singh

External links
 

1976 films
1970s Hindi-language films
Films scored by Usha Khanna